Blastobasis floridella is a moth in the  family Blastobasidae. It is found in the United States, including Florida and Oklahoma.

The wingspan is 11–16 mm. The ground color of the forewings is sordid ochreous, suffused with fuscous brown. The hindwings are gray, dusted with fuscous.

Larvae have been recorded feeding from the cones of Zamia pumila.

References

Moths described in 1910
Blastobasis